Madi languages may refer to:
Arawan languages of the Amazon
Ma'di languages of Uganda